The 8th European Short Course Swimming Championships was an international swimming meet organized by LEN, and held in Vienna, Austria, December 9–12, 2004. The meet featured teams from Europe, swimming in 38 short course events. It was held in Vienna's arena (Wiener Stadthalle), in a temporary pool.

Participating nations
36 nations had swimmers at the 2004 Short Course Europeans:

Results

Men's events

Women's events

Medal table

Performance awards
Best newcomers: Kateryna Zubkova (UKR) and Igor Borysik (UKR). (Both were voted by the media, and received a special prize of Euro 1500 each.)

Top performances: a total of 32,000 Euro was awarded to the overall top-7 male and female performances. The athletes sharing the prize money were:

 Antje Buschschulte (GER)
 László Cseh (HUN)
 Anna-Karin Kammerling (SWE)
 Josefin Lillhage (SWE)
 Peter Mankoč (SLO)
 Martina Moravcová (SVK)

 Flavia Rigamonti (SUI)
 Éva Risztov (HUN)
 Markus Rogan (AUT)
 Teresa Rohmann (GER)
 Thomas Rupprath (GER)

References

External links
Results book

2004 in swimming
S
2004
S
S
2000s in Vienna
December 2004 sports events in Europe